Hamid Khan is the name of:

Hamid Khan (Oz), a character in the HBO series Oz
Hamid Khan (lawyer) (born 1946), Pakistani lawyer
Hamid Khan (badminton) (born 1965), played for Singapore at the 1992 Summer Olympics
Hamid Khan Achakzai, Pakistani politician
Hamid Ali Khan (born 1953), Pakistani classical singer
Hamid Ali Khan (actor) (1922–1998), stage name Ajit Khan, Indian actor
Hamid Nawaz Khan, Pakistani general
Hamid Raza Khan (1875–1943), Indian Islamic scholar and mystic